"Pattern of My Life" is a 2009 song performed by Annie Lennox. It is a cover version of "Closer Now" by Keane which was a B-side to their debut single "Call Me What You Like". Lennox retitled the song, referring to a lyric in the song. It was one of two new tracks Lennox recorded for her 2009 greatest hits album The Annie Lennox Collection, and was released as a digital single on 24 May 2009 in the United Kingdom.

Track listing
"Pattern of My Life" (Radio edit) – 3:56

Music video
A music video for "Pattern of My Life" was added to YouTube through Lennox's official channel on 19 February 2009 and was included on the DVD disc of The Annie Lennox Collection.

Chart performance
The song failed to make impact on any charts worldwide, as it was only available as a digital download.

References

2009 singles
Annie Lennox songs
Songs written by Tim Rice-Oxley
Songs written by Tom Chaplin
Songs written by Richard Hughes (musician)
2000 songs
Keane (band) songs
RCA Records singles
Songs written by James Sanger